The 7th Cinemalaya Independent Film Festival was held from July 15 until 24, 2011 in Metro Manila, Philippines.

The festival opened on July 15 and close on July 24, 2011 at the Main Theater of the Cultural Center of the Philippines.

Entries
The winning film is highlighted with boldface and a dagger.

Directors Showcase
The following films contending for 2011 Directors Showcase. The Directors' Showcase sidebar is for directors who had presented commercially released films in their career.

New Breed
The following films contending for 2011 New Breed category. The New Breed section is for young and new talented filmmakers who will present their first feature film or directors who haven't presented commercially released films in their career.

Short films

Awards

Full-Length Features
Directors Showcase
 Best Film - Bisperas by Jeffrey Jeturian
 Audience Award - Patikul by Joel Lamangan
 Best Direction - Auraeus Solito for Busong
 Best Actor - Bembol Roco for Isda
 Best Actress - Raquel Villavicencio for Bisperas
 Best Supporting Actor - Jim Pebanco for Patikul
 Best Supporting Actress - Julia Clarete for Bisperas
 Best Cinematography - Boy Yniguez for Bisperas
 Best Editing -  Benjamin Gonzales Tolentino for Isda
 Best Sound - Diwa de Leon for Busong
 Best Original Music Score - Diwa de Leon for Busong
 Best Production Design - Digo Ricio for Bisperas

New Breed
 Best Film - Ang Babae sa Septic Tank by Marlon Rivera
 Special Jury Prize - Niño by Loy Arcenas
 Audience Award - Ang Babae sa Septic Tank by Marlon Rivera
 Best Direction - Marlon Rivera for Ang Babae sa Septic Tank
 Best Actor - Edgar Allan Guzman for Ligo na Ü, Lapit na Me
 Best Actress - Eugene Domingo for Ang Babae sa Septic Tank
 Best Supporting Actor - Arthur Acuña for Niño
 Best Supporting Actress - Shamaine Buencamino for Niño
 Best Screenplay - Chris Martinez for Ang Babae sa Septic Tank
 Best Cinematography - Arvin Viola for Ang Sayaw ng Dalawang Kaliwang Paa 
 Best Editing -  Lawrence Fajardo for Amok
 Best Sound - Albert Michael Idioma for Amok
 Best Original Music Score -  Christine Muyco, Jema Pamintuan for Ang Sayaw ng Dalawang Kaliwang Paa 
 Best Production Design - Laida Lim for Niño

Special Awards
 NETPAC Award - Boundary by Benito Bautista
 National Council for Children's Television Award - Patikul by Joel Lamangan

Short films
 Best Short Film - Walang Katapusang Kwarto by Emerson Reyes
 Special Jury Prize - Hanapbuhay by Henry Frejas
 Audience Award - Walang Katapusang Kwarto by Emerson Reyes
 Best Direction - Rommel Tolentino for Niño Bonito
 Best Screenplay - Emerson Reyes for Walang Katapusang Kwarto

References

External links
Cinemalaya Independent Film Festival

Cinemalaya Independent Film Festival
Cine
Cine
2011 in Philippine cinema